Caspase-activated DNase (CAD) or DNA fragmentation factor subunit beta is a protein that in humans is encoded by the DFFB gene. It breaks up the DNA during apoptosis and promotes cell differentiation. It is usually an inactive monomer inhibited by ICAD. This is cleaved before dimerization.

Function 

Apoptosis is a cell self-destruct process that removes toxic and/or useless cells during mammalian development and other life processes. The apoptotic process is accompanied by shrinkage and fragmentation of the cells and nuclei and degradation of the chromosomal DNA into nucleosomal units. DNA fragmentation factor (DFF) is a heterodimeric protein of 40-kD (DFFB) and 45-kD (DFFA) subunits. DFFA is the substrate for caspase-3 and triggers DNA fragmentation during apoptosis. DFF becomes activated when DFFA is cleaved by caspase-3. The cleaved fragments of DFFA dissociate from DFFB, the active component of DFF. DFFB has been found to trigger both DNA fragmentation and chromatin condensation during apoptosis. Multiple alternatively spliced transcript variants encoding distinct isoforms have been found for this gene, but the biological validity of some variants has not been determined.

Despite this gene being present in every cell, this protein is only expressed in different tissues and cell variety such as pancreas, heart, colon, leukocytes, prostate, ovary, placenta, kidney, spleen and thymus.

It is also known as caspase activated nuclease (CPAN), dna fragmentation factor 40 (DFF-40), DFF2 and DFFB. Besides, there are other nomenclatures as a result of combining the previous ones.

Structure 
This heterodimer is an endonuclease with a high content of cysteine residues. It remains inactive in growing cells while it is associated with its inhibitor (ICAD, DNA fragmentation factor 45 kDa subunit, DFFA or DFF45) resulting into a complex ICAD-CAD. Their dissociation allows DFF40 to oligomerize to form a large functional complex which is by itself an active DNase.

DFF40 subunit or CAD 
It weighs 40 kDa. Moreover, it contains three domains making up a CAD monomer: C1 or N-terminal CAD; C2 which conform three separate α chains and, at last, C3 which is the largest and functionally the most important. What is more, combining C3’s amino acids leads to 5 α helices, 4 β lamina and a loop at the catalytic C-terminal which interact with each other. Therefore, a cavity (active site) where DNA can fit is produced, even though there is another binding region responsible for stable DNA complex during its fragmentation.

DFF45 subunit or ICAD 
DFFA is encoded by an alternatively encrypted mRNAs originating two distinct forms: short (ICAD-S) and long (ICAD-L), which act like a specific chaperone ensuring the correct CAD's folding Besides, it contains two aspartic acid residues (Asp117 and Asp224) where CAD is identified and, consequently, it stays bounded until Caspase-3 splits this union.

Activation process 
Per usual in non-apoptotic growing cells caspase activated dnase is held in check inactivated in the cytoplasm thanks to the association with its inhibitor, inhibitor of caspase-activated DNase (ICAD) also known as DNA fragmentation factor 45 kDa (DFF45).

ICAD is encoded by alternatively spliced mRNAs which generate long (ICAD-L) and short (ICAD-S) forms of ICAD. Therefore, ICAD has a double function; it acts as a CAD inhibitor and also as a chaperone for CAD synthesis assisting the correct assembly of the protein.

ICAD has two caspase recognition sites at Asp117 and Asp224. CAD release from ICAD inhibition is achieved by cleavage of ICAD at these Asp residues by the caspase-3.

Caspase-3 is activated in the apoptotic cell. Caspase-3 activation is a cell requirement during early stages of the skeletal myoblast differentiation. Its catalytic site involves sulfohydryl group of Cys-285 and the imidazole ring of its His-237. The caspase-3 His-237 stabilizes the target Aspartate causing the break of the association of ICAD and CAD leaving the endonuclease CAD active allowing it to degrade chromosomal DNA.

Once the inhibitor is released and in order to properly function, two CAD monomers need to come together to form a functional dimer that has vertical symmetry.

Interactions 

DFFB has been shown to interact with DFFA.

Cell differentiation 
Caspase 3 is responsible for cellular differentiation, although it is unclear how this kind of protein can promote the cell apoptosis. Caspase signals resulting from the activation of nuclease CAD indicate that the cell differentiation is due to a CAD modification in chromatin structure.

CAD leads to the initiation of the DNA strand breakage, which occurs during terminal differentiation of some cell, such as skeletal muscle cell. Targeting of p21 promoter is responsible for inducing cell differentiation, which is promoted by modifying the DNA nuclear microenvironment.

The cell diversity is originated by cell differentiation, which has been attributed to the activation of specific transcription factors. It also depends on the activity of a protein or a common signal. The factor that seems to induce more cell differentiation is caspase-3 protease. This was identified as the penultimate stage of apoptosis pathways cell.

Some studies have shown that this differentiation is due to many CAD kinase substrates. Referring to the example of skeletal cells, their differentiation is associated to cleavage of the kinase MST1.

Moreover, it has been seen that CAD participates in the formation of genome whose DNA breaks during early stages of the cell differentiation. Besides, Caspase 3 induces DNA breaks in the promoter of the factor p21 and this strand breakup is related to p21 gene expression.

Cell apoptotic death 
The protein caspase DNase is an endonuclease involved in the cell apoptotic process that facilitates the DNA breakup. Cell apoptotic death is a process executed by cysteine proteases that allows the animals to keep their homeostasis, also regulated by other mechanisms such as the growth and cell differentiation. This biological response is characterized by the chromosomal DNA’s degradation in tiny fragments within the nucleus of the cell. After many investigations and research, it was possible to ensure that Caspase-activated DNase is the main responsible of this destruction due to a long list of stimuli.

One of the experiments carried out by the investigators in order to prove that theory was based on the introduction of mutated form of this protein inside both TF-1 human cells and Jurkat cells, which had already reacted to the usual (not mutated) form of the endonuclease and they had dead of apoptosis. As a result, these cells died taking into account this genetic modification but they did not show DNA breakup. This was the key evidence to prove that the CAD form is implicated in this part of the process because without its contribution the fragmentation did not take place.

Later, it was found that the way how this protein induces the DNA breakup is explained by its forms CAD and ICAD, which facilitate both the entry and exit in the nucleus of the cell.

References

Further reading 

  From 
 
 
 
 
 
 
 
 
 
 
 
 
 
 
 
 
 

Apoptosis
EC 3.1
Nucleases
Human proteins